Mbeya City Council Football Club, is a Tanzanian football team playing in the Tanzanian Premier League. The team was established in 2011 in Mbeya City which is in the Southern Highlands of southwest Tanzania.
Mbeya City FC is known by the names of Green City Boys, Purple Tigers and Jacaranda Warriors. Their home jersey is purple and white. The 20,000 capacity Sokoine Stadium is their home stadium.

External links
 Club logo

References

Football clubs in Tanzania